Nerussa is a rural locality (a station) in Suzemsky District, Bryansk Oblast, Russia. The population was 161 as of 2010. There are 4 streets.

Geography 
Nerussa is located 17 km north of Suzemka (the district's administrative centre) by road. Chelyuskin is the nearest rural locality.

References 

Rural localities in Suzemsky District